The Zulu's Heart is an extant 1908 American silent short drama film directed by D. W. Griffith for the American Mutoscope and Biograph Company. Location footage was shot in Cliffside, New Jersey. White actors portray Zulus.

Cast
 Charles Inslee as Zulu chief
 George Gebhardt as Zulu warrior
 Harry Solter as a Boer
 Florence Lawrence as Boer's wife
 Gladys Egan as Boer's daughter
 John R. Cumpson as Zulu warrior
 Arthur V. Johnson as Zulu warrior
 W. Chrystie Miller, uncredited 
 Alfred Paget, uncredited 
 Mack Sennett, uncredited

References

External links
 

1908 films
1908 drama films
1908 short films
Silent American drama films
American silent short films
American black-and-white films
Films directed by D. W. Griffith
Films set in South Africa
1900s American films
American drama short films